Sahajadpur is a census town in the Raghunathganj II CD block in the Jangipur subdivision of the Murshidabad district in the Indian state of West Bengal.

Geography

Location                   

Demographics
According to the 2011 Census of India, Shahjadpur had a total population of 23,280, of which 11,966 (51%) were males and 11,314 (48%) were females. Population in the age range 0-6 years was 3,806. The total number of literate persons in Shahjadpur was 1,2736 (65.40% of the population over 6 years).

 India census, Sahajadpur had a population of 15,720. Males constitute 48% of the population and females 52%. Sahajadpur has an average literacy rate of 44%, lower than the national average of 59.5%: male literacy is 53%, and female literacy is 37%. In Sahajadpur, 20% of the population is under 6 years of age.

Infrastructure
According to the District Census Handbook, Murshidabad,  2011, Sahajadpur covered an area of 1.57 km2. It had 20 km roads with both open and closed drains. The protected water-supply involved pressure tank, hand pump, tap water untreated source. It had 2,800 domestic electric connections, 20 road lighting points. Among the educational facilities, it had 5 primary schools, 1 senior secondary school in town, general degree college at Jangipur 6 km away. It had 5 non-formal education centres (Sarva Shiksha Abhiyan). It produced beedi, papad.

Healthcare 
Raghunathganj II CD block is one of the areas of Murshidabad district where ground water is affected by a high level of arsenic contamination. The WHO guideline for arsenic in drinking water is 10 mg/ litre, and the Indian Standard value is 50 mg/ litre. The maximum concentration in Raghunathaganj II CD block is 875 mg/litre.

References

Cities and towns in Murshidabad district